is a Japanese manga artist, Illustrator and animator.

Biography 
After a degree in theatre screenplay from Musashino University, she worked from 1963 to 1972 in Mushi Production with Osamu Tezuka for the creation of Astroboy, Kimba the White Lion, Princess Knight, Rocky Joe, and Bem.
Transferred in Italy from 1973, she worked as mankata for Disney comics in Italy on Mademoiselle Anne, Galaxy Express 999 and others.
She worked for long length animation movies, La Gabbianella e il Gatto, La Freccia Azzurra, Johan Padan, Aida degli Alberi and some TV productions like il Corsaro Nero.
Illustrator for children fables, she published three works: La storia di Sayo (2009), Sute, il Figlio degli Spiriti (2011) and Donran (2012).

Bibliography

External links 
 Osamu Tezuka Official
 Scuola Romana di Fumetti, Roman School of Comics in Italy
 Italian RAI TV Interview
 Intervista a Yoshiko Watanabe, Interview on Osamu Tezuka Italian fansite.

Japanese artists
Living people
Year of birth missing (living people)